Patrick Miller may refer to:

 Patrick Miller of Dalswinton (1731–1815), organised an early experimental steamboat
 Patrick Miller (politician) (died 1845), Scottish soldier and politician, MP for Dumfries Burghs 1790–96
 Patrick Miller (cricketer) (1907–1993), English cricketer
 Patrick Miller (artist) (born 1976), American artist
 Patrick Miller (soldier) (born 1980), American soldier
 Patrick Miller (basketball) (born 1992), American basketball player
 Patrick Miller (musician) (1952–2003), American musician
 Patrick D. Miller (fl. 2000s), American biblical scholar
 Patrick J. Miller (fl. 2004), American computer scientist

See also
 Pat Miller (disambiguation)
 Patricia Miller (disambiguation)